Hildebrand Horden (died 1696) was a London actor. He joined the United Company in 1694, just before it split in two as the senior actors, headed by Thomas Betterton, walked out and set up a cooperative company in Lincoln's Inn Fields. As he was young and untried, it is unlikely that Horden was invited to join them; at any rate, he remained with the United Company, where he rose into favour with audiences, speaking more than half of the recorded play prologues (a sign of success and prestige). On 18 May 1696 he was killed, at a young age, in a tavern brawl, by Elizeus Burges.

Colley Cibber, who worked at the company at the same time, describes Horden in his autobiography:

"This young man had almost every natural gift that could promise an excellent actor; he had besides a good deal of table-wit and humour, with a handsome person, and was every day rising into public favour. Before he was buried, it was observable that two or three days together several of the fair sex, well dressed, came in masks (then frequently worn) and some in their own coaches, to visit this theatrical hero in his shroud."

See also
The Relapse

References

Cibber, Colley (first published 1740, ed. Robert Lowe, 1889). An Apology for the Life of Colley Cibber, vol.1, vol 2. London. 
Article "Horden, Hildebrand", in Highfill, Philip Jr, Burnim, Kalman A., and Langhans, Edward (1973–93). Biographical Dictionary of Actors, Actresses, Musicians, Dancers, Managers and Other Stage Personnel in London, 1660–1800. 16 volumes. Carbondale, Illinois: Southern Illinois University Press.

1696 deaths
English male stage actors
17th-century births
17th-century English male actors